Pfatter is a municipality in the district of Regensburg in Bavaria, Germany. It lies on the river Danube. The Danube village used to be a central place in the Gäuboden and had a central function in its region.

Municipality structure
Pfatter (1769 inhabitants)
Geisling (876 inhabitants)
Griesau (214 inhabitants)
Gmünd (156 inhabitants)
Leiterkofen (60 inhabitants)

References

Regensburg (district)
Populated places on the Danube